Senator Brownson may refer to:

John W. Brownson (New York politician) (1807–1860), New York State Senate
Nathan Brownson (1742–1796), Georgia State Senate

See also
Senator Bronson (disambiguation)